Te Runanga Whakawhanaunga I Nga Hahi O Aotearoa (Māori Council of Churches) is an autonomous ecumenical organisation for Māori persons. It was formed in 1982, and has Anglican, Baptist, Roman Catholic, Methodist and Presbyterian membership. It is a member of the World Council of Churches and the Christian Conference of Asia.

External links 
World Council of Churches listing

Christian organizations established in 1982
Members of the World Council of Churches
National councils of churches
Māori religion
1982 establishments in New Zealand